Birkenhead West was a parliamentary constituency that returned one Member of Parliament (MP)  to the House of Commons of the Parliament of the United Kingdom, elected by the first past the post voting system.

History
The constituency was created by the Representation of the People Act 1918 for the 1918 general election when the Parliamentary Borough of Birkenhead was split between the East and West Divisions.

It was abolished by the Representation of the People Act 1948 for the 1950 general election, when it was included in the reconstituted constituency of Birkenhead.

Boundaries 
The County Borough of Birkenhead wards of Claughton, Cleveland, Grange, and Oxton.

Members of Parliament

Elections

Election in the 1910s

Elections in the 1920s

Elections in the 1930s

Election in the 1940s

See also

 History of parliamentary constituencies and boundaries in Cheshire

References

 
 

Parliamentary constituencies in North West England (historic)
Constituencies of the Parliament of the United Kingdom established in 1918
Constituencies of the Parliament of the United Kingdom disestablished in 1950
Birkenhead